Henry Cheever Pratt (1803–1880) was an American artist and explorer. He lived in Boston, Massachusetts.

Biography

Born in Orford, New Hampshire, and trained by Samuel F.B. Morse, Pratt painted landscapes of Maine on painting trips with Thomas Cole and of the American Southwest while on boundary surveying expeditions. John Russell Bartlett's A Personal Narrative of Explorations and Incidents in Texas, New Mexico, California, Sonora and Chihuahua (2 vols., 1854) contains 30 of Pratt's illustrations.

Pratt's paintings include View of Smith's West Texas Ranch (1852) now owned by the Texas Memorial Museum at the University of Texas. Other paintings are in the collections of Brown University and the Amon Carter Museum in Fort Worth, Texas.

H.C. Pratt also painted portraits. Through his career, portrait subjects included:

 Josefa Anchondo
 John Russell Bartlett (1852)
 Henry Gardner Bridges
 Adeline Burr Ellery
 Nicholas Emery
 Isaac Ilsley
 Adoniram Judson
 Marquis de Lafayette
 James Wiley Magoffin (1852)
 Benjamin Pierce
 Martha C. Dickinson Pooke
 Elizabeth Trull (1831), possibly one of the granddaughters of Capt. John Trull
 William Johnson Walker
 Russell Warren
 John B. Wheeler

Gallery

References

External links

 Fort Yuma, Colorado River. 1850
 Henry Cheever Pratt -- California art

19th-century American painters
19th-century American male artists
American male painters
American portrait painters
Artists from Boston
1803 births
1880 deaths
19th century in Boston
Burials at Christ Church, Philadelphia